Cameleon is a free and open source graphical language for functional programming, released under an MIT License.

Cameleon language is a graphical data flow language following a two-scale paradigm. It allows an easy up-scale, that is, the integration of any library writing in C++ into the data flow language. Cameleon language aims to democratize macro-programming by an intuitive interaction between the human and the computer where building an application based on a data-process and a GUI is a simple task to learn and to do. Cameleon language allows conditional execution and repetition to solve complex macro-problems.

Cameleon is built on an extension of the petri net model for the description of how the Cameleon language executes a composition.

Features 
 Graphical Algorithm Editor,
 Real time calibration,
 Dynamic building,
 Multi-Scale approach,
 XML-based model for data definition and manipulation based on XML Schema, XPath and XQuery,
 Easy integration of new algorithm with the dev kit.

See also 

Bioinformatics workflow management system
Business Process Management
CEITON
Dataflow
Petri net
Programming language
Visual programming language
Workflow
Workflow patterns
YAWL

References 
 George Pashev, George Totkov, EMS – A Workflow Programming Language and Environment, TEM Journal, 2018 
 JM Pereira, Modern Trends in Geomechanics, 2016
 Kenichi Soga, Krishna Kumar, Giovanna Biscontin, Geomechanics from Micro to Macro, Technology & Engineering, 2014
 Nasser Khalili, Adrian Russell, Arman Khoshghalb, Unsaturated Soils: Research & Applications, Technology & Engineering, 2014 
 J.-F. Bruchon, Effondrement capillaire, 2014
 J.-F. Bruchon, J.-M. Pereira, M. Vandamme, N. Lenoir, P. Delage, M. Bornert, Full 3D investigation and characterisation of capillary collapse of a loose unsaturated sand using X-ray CT. Granular Matter, 2013 SegSand
 J.-F Bruchon., Pereira J.-M., M., Vandamme, N. Lenoir, P. Delage and M. Bornert X-ray microtomography characterisation of the changes in statistical homogeneity of an unsaturated sand during imbibition Géotechnique letter, 2013
 IPOL communication, 2012
 Programmation par propriétés : application au traitement d’images, 2010
 Cameleon language Part 1: Processor O. Cugnon de Sevricourt, V. Tariel, 2011

External links 
 Official Web Site

C
Qt (software)
Workflow languages